Bonnac is a commune in the Ariège department of southwestern France. It lies between the altitudes of 237 and 413 m. The village currently lies at the bottom of a hill but was previously located on the hill as evidence by remains of foundations. A castle, now ruined, lay on top of the hill and was itself built on top of Roman foundations. The most notable building is the Eglise Saint-Pierre which dates to the 12th century and houses a baptismal font dating back to the early Romanesque era.

Population
Inhabitants of Bonnac are called Bonnacois.

See also
Communes of the Ariège department

References

External links
Bonnac village page
City hall site

Communes of Ariège (department)
Ariège communes articles needing translation from French Wikipedia